The Descoberto River Basin Environmental Protection Area is a protected area in the basin of the Descoberto River, which provides a large part of the water supply to the Federal District, Brazil.

Location

The environmental protected area has territory distributed over the administrative regions of Gama, Recanto das Emas, Samambaia, Ceilândia and Brazlândia, in the Federal District, and the municipalities of Padre Bernardo and Águas Lindas de Goiás, in Goiás.
It extends to the west of the Brasília National Park and includes the Brasília National Forest, the Barragem do Descoberto reservoir and the Descoberto State Park.
The Descoberto River, which originates with the Barracão and Capão da Onça streams in the administrative region of Brazlândia, is dammed to form the Descoberto reservoir, which supplies 60% of the water used by the Federal District.

Administration

It contains examples of the Cerrado biome.
It is managed by the Chico Mendes Institute for Biodiversity Conservation.
The area contains some human occupation.
It is IUCN protected area category V (protected landscape/seascape).
The purpose is to protect biological diversity, control human occupation and ensure sustainable use of natural resources.

Notes

Sources

Environmental protection areas of Brazil
Protected areas of Federal District (Brazil)
Protected areas of Goiás
1983 establishments in Brazil
Protected areas established in 1983